Air Guitar in Oulu is a 2003 documentary film by Canadian filmmaker Kent Sobey. The film was produced by the Farmhouse Productions with the support of the Canadian Television Fund. The IMDb estimated budget was 15,000 Canadian Dollars. Air Guitar in Oulu is distributed by iThentic.

The film follows the quest of Andrew "Air Raid" Buckles as he attempts to raise enough funds to travel to Oulu, Finland for the Air Guitar World Championships. His efforts include bake sales and street performance, backed by a boom box, of his air guitar techniques.

Buckles attends the competition and shares second place with Toby Peneha.

References

External links
 Air Guitar in Oulu Official Trailer

Canadian documentary films
2003 television films
2003 films
2003 documentary films
Documentary films about music and musicians
2000s English-language films
2000s Canadian films